The Calcutta Technical School (CTS) is a technical institute is located in the city of Kolkata, West Bengal of India. It is affiliated to the West Bengal State Council of Technical Education (WBSCTE), approved by All India Council For Technical Education (AICTE) and provides Diploma level technical education in Electrical, Mechanical, Computer Science and Civil Engineering.

History
Calcutta was the center of activity of British India during the 18th Century. After industrial revolution it was seeking its industrial expansion in its vast empire. The immense industrial potentiality of Bengal attracted the attention of entrepreneurs. As a result of a number of industries grew up in and around Calcutta. The requirement of the engineers of these industries were largely met by a few engineering colleges then existed. The problem engaged the attention of the Govt. of Bengal and The Calcutta Technical Institute Committee was appointed in 1912 to advise the Govt. on the question of creating a technical institute in Calcutta. The two institutes viz. Calcutta Technical Night School, Bowbazar and Bengal Technical Institute, Upper Circular Road were agreed to be absorbed by the proposed technical institute. Erection of the building on the land acquired by the Govt. of Bengal at a nominal rent of Rs. 1/annum was started in 1922 at an estimated expenditure of Rs. 8.5 lakh. Before the final opening of the school on 1 February 1926, the Governing Body appointed its first Principal Mr. E.G. Hogben from the U.K. The school was offered before converted into a full-fledged polytechnic in 1988, the following courses of studies:
1. Diploma Course in Electrical and Mechanical Engineering (4 years) of Board of Apprentice Training
2. Part-time Diploma Course in Civil Engineering of the state council for technical education, West Bengal
3. Shipwright Course 
4. Electric Supervisors' Course 
5. Coaching classes for A.M.I.E. examination 
6. Related instruction classes for Trade Apprentices under the Apprentice Act 1961

Departments 
CTS provides diploma level education in Mechanical Engineering, Computer Science and Technology, Civil Engineering  and Electrical Engineering.

References

External links 
 CTS official website
 Information on The Calcutta Technical School

Universities and colleges in Kolkata
Educational institutions established in 1927
1927 establishments in British India
Technical universities and colleges in West Bengal